Freundel, Freundl may refer to:

 Freundel Jerome Stuart, QC, MP (born c. 1949), a Prime Minister of Barbados
 Barry Freundel, an American Modern Orthodox rabbi convicted of voyeurism

Freundl 

 Carola Freundl was the married name of Carola Bluhm (born 1962, Berlin), a German politician (Die Linke).  However, following the break up of her marriage she announced in 2005 that she was reverting to using her maiden name.

See also 
 Freund
 Freundlich
 Freud

References

Jewish given names
Jewish surnames
German given names
German-language surnames
Yiddish-language surnames
Surnames from nicknames